Delany may refer to:

 Delany (surname)
 Delany (Upper Lusatia), an area in Germany
 Delany College, in Granville, New South Wales, Australia

See also
 Delaney (disambiguation)